Robert Bilsand McGregor, MBE (born 3 April 1944), nicknamed the "Falkirk Flyer", is a Scottish former competitive swimmer.

Swimming career
He competed in eight events at the 1964 and 1968 Summer Olympics. He won a silver medal in the 100-metre freestyle in 1964, and finished fourth in the 100-metre freestyle and 4×100-metre freestyle relay in 1968.  He was a second favourite for the 1963 BBC Sports Personality of the Year Award.  In 2002 he was inducted into the Scottish Sports Hall of Fame.  Olympic selectors could not believe that he trained in a 25-metre pool in Falkirk when the selectors arrived to critique him prior to the Tokyo Olympics.

McGregor competed at the 1962 and 1966 British Empire and Commonwealth Games, winning a silver medal on each occasion in the 110-yard freestyle.

He is a six times winner of the British Championship in 100 metres freestyle (1962, 1963, 1964, 1967, 1968 and 1968). In the 1963 event he set a world record in the heats (54.4 sec) and the final (54.1 sec). He also won the 1963 200 metres freestyle.

Personal life
He retired from swimming in 1968 and now works as an architect in Glasgow.  He lives in Helensburgh with his wife and family.  His father, David McGregor, was an Olympic water polo player.

See also
 List of Commonwealth Games medallists in swimming (men)
 List of Olympic medalists in swimming (men)

References

External links

Video of Bobby McGregor competing in 1963

1944 births
Living people
European Aquatics Championships medalists in swimming
Members of the Order of the British Empire
Olympic silver medallists for Great Britain
Olympic swimmers of Great Britain
Scottish Olympic medallists
Sportspeople from Falkirk
Swimmers at the 1962 British Empire and Commonwealth Games
Swimmers at the 1964 Summer Olympics
Swimmers at the 1966 British Empire and Commonwealth Games
Swimmers at the 1968 Summer Olympics
Medalists at the 1964 Summer Olympics
Olympic silver medalists in swimming
Scottish male swimmers
Commonwealth Games medallists in swimming
Commonwealth Games silver medallists for Scotland
Universiade medalists in swimming
Universiade silver medalists for Great Britain
Medalists at the 1967 Summer Universiade
Medallists at the 1966 British Empire and Commonwealth Games